Winchmore Hill is a village in the parish of Penn,  in Buckinghamshire, England.

The village is often confused with Winchmore Hill in London. It has a triangular green in the centre (on which a fête is held regularly). The houses around the green mainly date from the 20th century. The local village cricket team is Winchmore Hill Cricket Club, which has a large junior section with teams playing in local leagues.

The village at one time had four pubs. The Queen's Head, The Nelson, The Plough and The Potters Arms. Currently, The Plough and The Potters Arms are trading.

The Winchmore Hill Village Show is held annually in early September.  It consists of the Produce Show - where villagers enter their own fruit, vegetables, preserves and even homemade bread to be judged - as well as countless traditional village stalls and competitions, all centred on a marquee erected on the common.  Tug-of-War, Welly Throwing, 5-a-side football and a Dog Show are just some of the events that take place on the day.

References

Hamlets in Buckinghamshire